Cerithium atromarginatum is a species of sea snail, a marine gastropod mollusk in the family Cerithiidae.

Description

Distribution
The distribution of Cerithium atromarginatum includes the Pacific Ocean.

References

Cerithiidae
Gastropods described in 1933